The 2021 Eastern Intercollegiate Volleyball Association Tournament was a men's volleyball tournament for the Eastern Intercollegiate Volleyball Association during the 2021 NCAA Division I & II men's volleyball season. It was held April 16 through April 24, 2021 at campus sites. The winner received The Association's automatic bid to the 2021 NCAA Volleyball Tournament.

Seeds
With the Ivy League choosing not to participate in spring athletics, neither Harvard nor defending conference champion Princeton participated in the season. As a result EIVA changed tournament formats. All six schools participated in the tournament. Seeds 1 and 2 received byes to the semifinals, which were played at Rec Hall in University Park, PA. The Championship also was played at Rec Hall. Seed 3 played Seed 6, and Seed 4 played Seed 5 in the conference tournament opening round at the 3 and 4 seeds’ schools.  

Seedings and placement were to be determined by win percentage should teams not have played every match. Tiebreaker procedures were as follows:
Head-to-head match record
Head-to-head sets won against each other
Head-to-head points amongst the tied teams
Sets winning percentage within the conference
Points against teams within the conference
Coin toss by the EIVA Commissioner

Schedule and results

Bracket

Notes

References

2021 Eastern Intercollegiate Volleyball Association season
Volleyball competitions in the United States